Micki is a given name. Notable people with the name include:

 Micki DuPont (born 1980), professional ice hockey player
 Micki Free, professional musician
 Micki Grant (born 1941), American singer, actress, writer and composer
 Addie "Micki" Harris (1940–1982), member of the all-girl singing group The Shirelles
 Micki King (born 1944), American former diver and coach, and Olympic gold medalist
 Micki Marlo (1928–2016), American model and singer
 Micki Pistorius (born 1961), a South Africa profiler
 Michael Steele (musician) (born 1955), bassist, guitarist, songwriter, and singer, known as Micki Steele while with The Runaways

Unisex given names